Dimitris Mousiaris was a Greek football player, one of the greatest talents of the 1970s. He played, as a professional, only for his hometown team AEL from 1977 to 1979, earning 64 caps and scoring 10 goals. He was a part of U-19 and U-21 Greece national teams and he was recognized by the great Mimis Domazos as his heir apparent.

Mousiaris died in a car accident in Thiva on 6 September 1979, along with his teammate Dimitrios Koukoulitsios. He was only 20. In the car was also Giannis Valaoras, who survived and became one of AEL's all-time best players.

1959 births
1979 deaths
Footballers from Larissa
Athlitiki Enosi Larissa F.C. players
Greek footballers
Road incident deaths in Greece
Association football midfielders